A ballistic parachute, ballistic reserve parachute, or emergency ballistic reserve parachute, is a parachute ejected from its casing by a small explosion, much like that used in an ejection seat. The advantage of the ballistic parachute over a conventional parachute is that it ejects the parachute canopy (oftentimes via a small rocket), causing it to open rapidly, this makes it ideal for attaching to light aircraft, hang gliders and microlights, where an emergency may occur in close proximity to the ground. In such a situation, a conventional parachute would not open quickly enough.

In 1982, Comco Ikarus developed the FRS rocket-launched parachute system for its ultralight and hanglider aircraft. In 1998, Cirrus Aircraft (then known as Cirrus Design) provided the first ballistic parachutes as standard equipment on their line of type-certified aircraft, the Cirrus SR20; and in 2016, the company delivered the Cirrus Vision SF50, the first jet aircraft with a ballistic parachute. Some helicopters are also fitted with a ballistic parachute.

See also
 Ballistic Recovery Systems – manufacturer of ballistic parachutes for use in light aircraft
 Scott D. Anderson – test pilot who flight tested the first certified ballistic parachute

Notes and references

Parachuting
Safety equipment